Scott Jon Thorkelson (2 March 1958 – 19 May 2007) was a member of the House of Commons of Canada from 1988 to 1993. His background was in research, consulting and fundraising.

Born in Gimli, Manitoba, Thorkelson became active with the Progressive Conservative party's as a youth auxiliary leader and as an assistant to John Allen Fraser, Minister of Fisheries and Oceans in the mid-1980s under the Brian Mulroney government.

Thorkelson was elected to Parliament in the 1988 federal election at the Edmonton—Strathcona electoral district for the Progressive Conservative party. He served in the 34th Canadian Parliament but lost to Hugh Hanrahan of the Reform Party in the 1993 federal election.

Thorkelson died unexpectedly in Edmonton at his parents' residence due to a heart attack at age 49.

References

External links
 

1958 births
2007 deaths
Members of the House of Commons of Canada from Alberta
Progressive Conservative Party of Canada MPs
People from Gimli, Manitoba
Canadian people of Icelandic descent